LITS, formerly known as Nuruomino (ヌルオミノ), is a binary determination puzzle published by Nikoli.

Rules
LITS is played on a rectangular grid, typically 10×10; the grid is divided into polyominoes, none of which have fewer than four cells.  The goal is to shade in a tetromino within each pre-printed polyomino in such a way that no two matching tetrominoes are orthogonally adjacent (with rotations and reflections counting as matching), and that the shaded cells form a valid nurikabe: they are all orthogonally contiguous (form a single polyomino) and contain no 2×2 square tetrominoes as subsets.

History
The puzzle was first printed in Puzzle Communication Nikoli #106; the original title is a combination of 'nuru' (Japanese: "to paint") and 'omino' (polyomino). In issue #112, the title was changed to the present one, which represents the four (of five) tetrominoes used in the puzzle: the L-shape, the straight, the T-shape, and the skew (square tetrominoes may never appear in the puzzle as they are a direct violation of the rule).

Solving Strategies 
There are some simple, and difficult, strategies for this puzzle.

Instantly solvable/Chains 
There are 4 different "instantly solvable" cases, the L, S, T, and I can all be instantly solved in boxes that only have 4 blocks.

There are also "chains" or 4 blocks eliminating a block from a 5 block box, creating another location for the next tetromino.

Inherent locational placements 
If you see 5 pieces, you will always be able to place at least one block inside of the pentomino(like tetromino, but for 5). Like if you see a t with an extra block on the top, the two spots in the middle can be filled in, since every possible tetromino takes place in those 2 blocks. Every other location can be inherently assumed based on the amount of possible tetrominoes, and the overlapping tiles of all of them.

See also
List of Nikoli puzzle types

External links
Nikoli's English page on LITS

Logic puzzles